Monica Allison is an actress and voice actor. She is perhaps best known for her role as Hazel Gordy in 
The Jacksons: An American Dream and the voice of Julie in The Adventures of Brer Rabbit.

Personal life
She was born in 1966. Her husband is a Warner Bro’s artist, singer Martin Kember, who was once a member of the R&B band “Color Me Badd”. She is the daughter of McDonald’s Restaurant icon Robert M. Beavers Jr., who was the first African-American elected to the Board of Directors for the McDonald’s restaurant corporation.

Filmography

Film

Television

References

External links

Living people
American television actresses
American film actresses
American video game actresses
American voice actresses
1968 births
21st-century American women